Club Deportivo Capiatá, is a Paraguayan football club based in the city of Capiatá. The club was founded on September 8, 2008 and plays in the Primera División of the Paraguayan league. Their home games are played at the Estadio Lic. Erico Galeano Segovia.

History

The club was founded on September 4, 2008; from the Capiateña Football League.

In 2010 play for the first time in Paraguayan División Intermedia.

In 2012 they finished in 2nd place, thus getting promoted to the Primera División for the first time in history.

In 2013 they made history again by qualifying to the 2014 Copa Sudamericana in their first year in the Primera División.

Honours
Paraguayan Segunda División:
Runner-up (1): 2012
Interleague National Championship:
Runner-up (1): 2007-2008

Current squad

Notable players
To appear in this section a player must have either:
 Been part of a national team at any time.
 Played in the first division of any other football association (outside of Paraguay).
 Played in a continental and/or intercontinental competition.

2000's
Ninguno
2010's
  Carlos Zorrilla (2011–2012)
  Julio Santa Cruz (2013, 2016–)
  Diego Cabrera (2015–)
  Gabriel Santilli (2015–)
  Agustín Gil Clarotti (2016–)
  Rodrigo Soria (2016–)
Non-CONMEBOL players
  Christ Mbondi (2016–)

References

External links
Official Facebook Website

Football clubs in Paraguay
Association football clubs established in 2008
2008 establishments in Paraguay